Walt Whitman High School is a four-year public secondary school located at 301 West Hills Road, in Huntington Station, New York.  It is South Huntington Union Free School District's only high school, serving students in Huntington Station, South Huntington, Melville, and West Hills.  The school typically has around 2,000 students in grades 9–12.

Notable alumni
 Michael Campbell of the punk rock band Latterman
 Adam Ferrara, actor, comedian 
 Jimmy Haslip, founder and bass player of the jazz fusion group "The Yellowjackets" graduated in 1970.
 Bruce Kapler, former sax player on the Late Show with David Letterman graduated in 1971.
 Jesse Zook Mann, Emmy Award-winning television and film director graduated in 1998
 Neal Marlens, creator of the sitcoms The Wonder Years, Growing Pains and Ellen.
 Laura Pergolizzi, pop/rock singer and songwriter
Tim Stearns, professor at Stanford University, graduated in 1979
 Genevievette Walker-Lightfoot, attorney

Athletes
 Dan Calichman, MLS player
 Gerry Cooney, boxer
 Tom Gugliotta, NBA player
 James "Jimmy" Jerkens, Thoroughbred horse racing trainer, graduated 1977
 Myles Jones, professional lacrosse player
 A. J. Preller, MLB executive

Sports
Walt Whitman High School host varsity teams in badminton, baseball, basketball, bowling, cheerleading, cross country, fencing, football, field hockey, kickline, lacrosse, soccer, softball, swimming, tennis, track and field, volleyball and wrestling.

In 1964 and 1966, Walt Whitman High School hosted the 2nd and 4th annual NYSPHSAA state wrestling tournaments. The event didn't return to Long Island again until Nassau Veterans Memorial Coliseum hosted it in 2006. They won the State Championship for soccer in 2015.

Athletic Championships
 Football 1974 Suffolk County Conference AAA Champions defeating Huntington 32-30 in final, Rutger's Cup Champions (awarded)
 Football 1984 Suffolk County Division 1 Champions defeating Sachem 17–24 in final (This was as far as the team could have gone in those two seasons. The Long Island HS Football championships were not instituted until several years later.)
 Baseball 1975, 1976 Long Island Champions
 Cross Country 1975 New York State Champion
 Cross Country 2008 Section XI Suffolk County Champions (Class AA)
Wrestling 1965 League I Champions
Wrestling 1983 League 1A Champions
Wrestling 2011–2012 League 2 Champions
Girls Varsity Basketball Team League Champs 2013
WWHS Boys Varsity Soccer Team won Suffolk County CLASS A Soccer Champion
WWHS Boys Varsity Soccer Team 2015-2016 New York State Champions
WWHS Marching Band 2015, 2016, 2017, 2018, 2019, and 2021 New York State Champions
WWHS Indoor Color Guard, 2017 and 2018 National Champions
Women's Soccer 1985,1986 and 1992 New York State Champions
Tennis 2011 unseeded Brandon Stone wins Suffolk County title 5-7, 7-6(5), 7-5 over Jeremy Dubin of South Hampton.

References

External links
The Ultimate Walt Whitman High School Alumni Directory (not affiliated with Walt Whitman High School)
WWHS Main Page

Public high schools in New York (state)
Huntington, New York
Schools in Suffolk County, New York